Dr. Seán Murphy (born 1932 in Camp, County Kerry) is an Irish former Gaelic footballer who played for his local club Dingle and at senior level for the Kerry county team from 1953 until 1961.

Football career
Murphy was born in Camp, County Kerry. He played club football for Dingle and at University College Dublin (UCD), where he played for UCD GAA and qualified as a medical doctor. His greatest footballing performance was in the All-Ireland Senior Football Final of 1959, when Kerry defeated Galway in what has become known as "the Seán Murphy All-Ireland".  Murphy's performance in that game has been described as the "definitive classical exhibition of halfback play".  He was rewarded with the Texaco Footballer of the Year title for that year.  Murphy's brothers Pádraig, Seamus & Tomas also played for Kerry.

Later life
In 1984, the GAA's centenary year Seán Murphy was named right half-back on the Football Team of the Century. In 1999 he was again honoured by the GAA by being named on their Gaelic Football Team of the Millennium.

Dr. Murphy now lives between Tralee and England.

See also 
 List of people on stamps of Ireland

References

1932 births
Living people
Alumni of University College Dublin
Annascaul Gaelic footballers
Camp Gaelic footballers
Dingle Gaelic footballers
Kerry inter-county Gaelic footballers
Texaco Footballers of the Year
UCD Gaelic footballers